Awaking the Gods: Live in Mexico is the first live album by the German symphonic metal band Haggard. It was released on 24 September 2001 by Drakkar Entertainment. It was filmed at Teatro Ferrocarrilero in Mexico City during the tour for the Awaking the Centuries album. The DVD contains footage from Teotihuacan between the songs.

Due to technical issues the DVD audio is from the studio albums Awaking the Centuries and And Thou Shalt Trust... the Seer.

Reception 
The album received a positive review by the German Sonic Seducer magazine, calling it a unique fusion of Medieval, Baroque and Classical music with traditional metal. The musical skills of the band members were also stressed out in this review. Rock Hard noted the balanced recording and wrote that the album had authentically caught the concert's atmosphere.

Track listing 

The DVD Plus version contains three DVD tracks:
 "Final Victory"
 "In a Pale Moon's Shadow"
 "Awaking the Centuries"

References 

Haggard (band) albums
2001 live albums